The CBS Morning News is an American early-morning news broadcast presented weekdays on the CBS television network. The program features late-breaking news stories, national weather forecasts and sports highlights. Since 2013, it has been anchored by Anne-Marie Green, who concurrently anchored the CBS late-night news program Up to the Minute until its cancellation in September 2015.

The program is broadcast live at 4:00 a.m. Eastern Time Zone, preceding local news beginning at 4:30 a.m. on many CBS stations. It is transmitted in a continuous half-hour broadcast delay loop until 10:00 a.m. Eastern Time, when CBS Mornings begin in the Pacific Time Zone. In the few markets where the station does not produce a morning newscast, it may air in a two- to three-hour loop immediately before the start of CBS Mornings. The show is updated for any breaking news occurring before 7:00 a.m. Eastern Time, while stations throughout the network will join CBS Mornings in all time zones past that time at their local discretion or network orders for live coverage.

History

Background
The CBS Morning News title was originally used as the name of a conventional morning news program that served as a predecessor to the network's current CBS Mornings. For most of the 1960s and 1970s, the program aired as a 60-minute hard news broadcast at 7:00 a.m., preceding Captain Kangaroo and airing opposite the first hour of NBC's Today. Walter Cronkite and sportscaster Jim McKay both anchored the original CBS Morning News at one time. Joseph Benti became the anchor in 1969. Other anchors of the broadcast in this format included John Hart, Hughes Rudd, Sally Quinn, Richard Threlkeld, Lesley Stahl and Bruce Morton.

CBS Early Morning News/current Morning News format
The program first aired in its current format on October 4, 1982 as the CBS Early Morning News. It was a half-hour extension of the two-hour CBS Morning News which aired directly opposite Today. Bill Kurtis and Diane Sawyer originally anchored both the Early Morning News and the Morning News of that era. Sawyer departed both programs in mid-1984, to be named a correspondent for 60 Minutes later that year. In her absence, Kurtis was joined by a rotating series of co-hosts, principally Maria Shriver, Meredith Vieira and Jane Wallace.

Kurtis anchored the Early Morning News solo until March 1985, while co-anchoring the Morning News with Phyllis George until July of that year. Faith Daniels took over and would remain on the anchor desk, most of the time sharing the role with Forrest Sawyer (July to December 1985 and January to September 1987) and later Douglas Edwards and Charles Osgood, until Daniels left CBS to become anchor of competing early-morning newscast NBC News at Sunrise in 1990. Osgood would remain anchor of the CBS Morning News until June 1992, paired with Victoria Corderi from 1990 to 1991, Giselle Fernández through February 1992, and then with Meredith Vieira for the remainder of Osgood's run as co-anchor. After Osgood left the program in 1992, the anchor turnover continued.

The program continued to maintain a two-anchor format until Thalia Assuras was appointed as anchor of the CBS Morning News in 1998, at which point the program switched to a single-anchor format, which it has had ever since. In March 2009, when Michelle Gielan was named anchor of Up to the Minute, the CBS Morning News became integrated with the overnight news program, using the same anchors on both programs.

In November 2010, CBS Morning News became the third and final early morning news program to begin broadcasting in high-definition television; its counterpart, Up to the Minute, continued to be broadcast in standard-definition television until November 2012, when the program converted to high definition. In November 2012, production of the CBS Morning News and Up to the Minute relocated in the CBS Broadcast Center. The CBS Morning News moved to the studio of the CBS Evening News, and Up to the Minute was moved to the Studio 57 facility, the same studio where CBS This Morning (predecessor of CBS Mornings)  is also broadcast, until its cancellation on September 18, 2015.

On September 21, 2015, the CBS Morning News debuted a new look, including a new logo and updated on-air graphics that are similar to those from the network's morning news program CBS This Morning. In addition, production of the program moved to the newsroom of CBS This Morning, where broadcasts of CBS News Streaming Network are also produced. Its long-running counterpart, Up to the Minute, was replaced the same day by the CBS Overnight News.

On March 11, 2020, the CBS Broadcast Center was temporarily closed after a number of CBS News staffers tested positive for coronavirus disease 2019. While CBS News did attempt to reopen the Broadcast Center with minimal crews following a thorough decontamination and cleaning, a second shutdown on March 18 along with directives by CBS News President Susan Zirinsky in the wake of the impact of the COVID-19 pandemic on television resulted in dramatic changes to many of CBS News's programs and operations. CBSN had itself experienced major issues in both producing a normal schedule, with its operations largely being outsourced temporarily to its CBS Television Stations, and with producing programs for CBS News.

While CBS News did attempt to produce the CBS Morning News with limited staff and graphics from its Washington, D.C. bureau the following week, it became impossible to consistently produce the program under their normal standards, and as a result production of the CBS Morning News was temporarily suspended beginning on March 24, 2020, with a repeat of the CBS Evening News or local newscasts or programming taking its place. On August 31 of the same year, nearly six months after the pandemic began, production of the CBS Morning News resumed with its primary anchor, Anne-Marie Green, anchoring from her home studio.

On-air staff

Current
 Anne-Marie Green (2013–present)

Former

 Bill Kurtis (1982–1985; now at Decades)
 Diane Sawyer (1982–1984; now with ABC News)
 Maria Shriver (rotating co-anchor; 1984–1985; now with NBC News)
 Meredith Vieira (rotating co-anchor; 1984–1985; main anchor; 1992–1993; later host of Who Wants to Be a Millionaire (2002-2013), then host of The Meredith Vieira Show (2014-2016)); now at NBC News
 Jane Wallace (rotating co-anchor; 1984–1985)
 Faith Daniels (1985–1990; later with NBC as anchor of NBC News at Sunrise and host of A Closer Look with Faith Daniels)
 Forrest Sawyer (July–December 1985 and January–September 1987; now with Fox News)
 Douglas Edwards (1987) (deceased)
 Charles Osgood (1987–1992; later became host of CBS News Sunday Morning, now retired)
 Victoria Corderi (1990–1991)
 Giselle Fernández (1991–1992)
 John Roberts (1992–1994; now with Fox News)
 Monica Gayle (1993–1994; retired from WJBK in Detroit)
 Dana King (1994–1995; retired from KPIX-TV in San Francisco)
 Troy Roberts (1995–1996); still at CBS News
 Jane Robelot (1995–1996; now at WYFF-TV in Greenville, South Carolina)
 Kristin Jeannette-Meyers (1996–1997)
 Cynthia Bowers (1996–1998)
 Thalia Assuras (1998–1999)
 Julie Chen (1999–October 2002; remains with CBS as host of  Big Brother)
 Melissa McDermott (2000 – March 10, 2006)
 Susan McGinnis (October 2002–January 2008)
 Meg Oliver (March 20, 2006 – March 20, 2009)
 Michelle Gielan (March 23, 2009 – June 18, 2010)
 Betty Nguyen (June 21, 2010 – April 6, 2012; now with WPIX in New York City)
 Terrell Brown (2012–2013; now with WLS-TV in Chicago)

See also
 The Early Show – Defunct morning news/talk program, which aired on CBS from 1999 to 2012.
 Early Today - Competing early-morning news program on NBC, which debuted in 1999.
 America This Morning – Competing early-morning news program on ABC, which debuted in 1982.

References

1980s American television news shows
1982 American television series debuts
1990s American television news shows
2000s American television news shows
2010s American television news shows
2020s American television news shows
CBS original programming
CBS News
English-language television shows
Television shows filmed in New York City